The Furggubäumhorn (also known as Punta d'Aurona) is a mountain of the Lepontine Alps, which is located on the border between Switzerland and Italy. It is located on the main chain of the Alps, approximately halfway between the Wasenhorn and the Bortelhorn.

On the north side of the mountain lies the Bortelsee.

References

External links
 Furggubäumhorn on Hikr

Mountains of the Alps
Mountains of Valais
Mountains of Piedmont
Italy–Switzerland border
International mountains of Europe
Lepontine Alps
Mountains of Switzerland
Two-thousanders of Switzerland